Tiwa-English Dictionary: with English-Tiwa Index is a dictionary of the Tiwa language of Northeast India.

About the author
Dr. UV Jose who has a PhD in linguistics, has been associated with Umswai Valley, the Tiwa tribe and the Tiwa language for more than 10 years.

His analysis of Tiwa is aided by his knowledge of related languages like Garo, Rabha and Boro, and that of Khasi, Karbi, Assamese and Hindi, with which Tiwa has had, and continues to have much contact.

See also
Deo Langkhui
Wanshuwa Festival
Shikdamakha
Tiwa Autonomous Council (Tiwashong)
Machal Lalung

References

Dictionaries by language
Tiwa (India)